Canada competed at the 1952 Winter Olympics in Oslo, Norway.  Canada has competed at every Winter Olympic Games.

Medalists

Alpine skiing

Men

Women

Cross-country skiing

Men

Figure skating

Men

Women

Pairs

Ice hockey

The tournament was run in a round-robin format with nine teams participating.

Canada 15-1 Germany FR
Canada 13-3 Finland
Canada 11-0 Poland
Canada 4-1 Czechoslovakia
Canada 11-2 Switzerland
Canada 3-2 Sweden
Norway 2-11 Canada
Canada 3-3 USA

Top scorers

Ski jumping

Speed skating

Men

References

 Olympic Winter Games 1952, full results by sports-reference.com

Nations at the 1952 Winter Olympics
1952
Olympics